The 1975 Pan American Games, officially known as the VII Pan American Games, were a continental multi-sport event held in Mexico City, Mexico, from October 12 to October 26, 1975. At the Games, 3,146 athletes selected from 33 National Olympic Committees (NOCs) participated in events in 19 sports. Twenty-three nations earned medals during the competition, and nine won at least one gold medal.

Medal table 

The ranking in this table is based on medal counts published by several media organizations. By default, the table is ordered by the number of gold medals won by the athletes representing a nation. (In this context, a nation is an entity represented by a NOC). The number of silver medals is taken into consideration next and then the number of bronze medals. If nations are still tied, equal ranking is given and they are listed alphabetically by IOC country code.

To sort this table by nation, total medal count, or any other column, click on the  icon next to the column title.

Notes 

  Some sources appoint that the United States achieved 47 bronze medals, while others count 48. This would result in a total of 246 medals earned by American athletes during the Games.
  Some reports say that Cuba earned 57 gold medals and 32 bronze medals, instead of 56 and 33, respectively. This would result in the same total medal count for Cuban athletes during the Games.
  Some sources appoint that Canada actually achieved 18 gold medals and 38 bronze medals, despite reports counting 19 and 40, respectively. This would result in a total of 91 medals earned by Canadian athletes during the Games.

References 

General

 

Specific

See also 

Medal table
Pan American Games medal tables